The International Criminal Tribunal for the former Yugoslavia (ICTY) was a body of the United Nations that was established to prosecute the war crimes that had been committed during the Yugoslav Wars and to try their perpetrators. The tribunal was an ad hoc court located in The Hague, Netherlands.

It was established by Resolution 827 of the United Nations Security Council, which was passed on 25 May 1993. It had jurisdiction over four clusters of crimes committed on the territory of the former Yugoslavia since 1991: grave breaches of the Geneva Conventions, violations of the laws or customs of war, genocide, and crimes against humanity. The maximum sentence that it could impose was life imprisonment. Various countries signed agreements with the UN to carry out custodial sentences.

A total of 161 persons were indicted; the final indictments were issued in December 2004, the last of which were confirmed and unsealed in the spring of 2005. The final fugitive, Goran Hadžić, was arrested on 20 July 2011. The final judgment was issued on 29 November 2017 and the institution formally ceased to exist on 31 December 2017.

Residual functions of the ICTY, including oversight of sentences and consideration of any appeal proceedings initiated since 1 July 2013, are under the jurisdiction of a successor body, the International Residual Mechanism for Criminal Tribunals (IRMCT).

History

Creation 

United Nations Security Council Resolution 808 of 22 February 1993 decided that "an international tribunal shall be established for the prosecution of persons responsible for serious violations of international humanitarian law committed in the territory of the former Yugoslavia since 1991", and called on the Secretary-General to "submit for consideration by the Council ... a report on all aspects of this matter, including specific proposals and where appropriate options ... taking into account suggestions put forward in this regard by Member States".

The Court was originally proposed by German Foreign Minister Klaus Kinkel. 

Resolution 827 of 25 May 1993 approved the S/25704 report of the Secretary-General and adopted the Statute of the International Tribunal annexed to it, formally creating the ICTY. It was to have jurisdiction over four clusters of crimes committed on the territory of the former SFR Yugoslavia since 1991: 

Grave breaches of the Geneva Conventions
Violations of the laws or customs of war
Genocide
Crime against humanity. 

The maximum sentence the ICTY could impose for these crimes was life imprisonment.

Implementation 
In 1993, the ICTY built its internal infrastructure. 17 states had signed an agreement with the ICTY to carry out custodial sentences.

1993–1994: In the first year of its existence, the Tribunal laid foundations for its existence as a judicial organ. It established the legal framework for its operations by adopting the rules of procedure and evidence, as well as its rules of detention and directive for the assignment of defense counsel. Together, these rules established a legal aid system for the Tribunal. As the ICTY was a part of the United Nations and was the first international court for criminal justice, the development of a juridical infrastructure was considered quite a challenge. However, after the first year, the first ICTY judges had drafted and adopted all the rules for court proceedings.

1994–1995: The ICTY established its offices within the Aegon Insurance Building in The Hague (which was, at the time, still partially in use by Aegon) and detention facilities in Scheveningen in The Hague (the Netherlands). The ICTY hired many staff members and by July 1994, the Office of the Prosecutor had sufficient staff to begin field investigations. By November 1994, first indictments were presented and confirmed, and in 1995, the staff numbered over 200 persons from all over the world.

Operation 

In 1994 the first indictment was issued against the Bosnian-Serb concentration camp commander Dragan Nikolić. This was followed on 13 February 1995 by two indictments comprising 21 individuals which were issued against a group of 21 Bosnian-Serbs charged with committing atrocities against Muslim and Croat civilian prisoners. While the war in the former Yugoslavia was still raging, the ICTY prosecutors showed that an international court was viable. However, no accused was arrested.

The court confirmed eight indictments against 46 individuals and issued arrest warrants. Bosnian Serb indictee Duško Tadić became the subject of the Tribunal's first trial. Tadić was arrested by German police in Munich in 1994 for his alleged actions in the Prijedor region in Bosnia-Herzegovina (especially his actions in the Omarska, Trnopolje and Keraterm detention camps). He made his first appearance before the ICTY Trial Chamber on 26 April 1995, and pleaded not guilty to all of the charges in the indictment.

1995–1996: Between June 1995 and June 1996, 10 public indictments had been confirmed against a total of 33 individuals. Six of the newly indicted persons were transferred in the Tribunal's detention unit. In addition to Duško Tadic, by June 1996 the tribunal had Tihomir Blaškić, Dražen Erdemović, Zejnil Delalić, Zdravko Mucić, Esad Landžo and Hazim Delić in custody. Erdemović became the first person to enter a guilty plea before the tribunal's court. Between 1995 and 1996, the ICTY dealt with miscellaneous cases involving several detainees, which never reached the trial stage.

Accomplishments 
In 2004, the ICTY published a list of five accomplishments "in justice and law":

 "Spearheading the shift from impunity to accountability", pointing out that, until very recently, it was the only court judging crimes committed as part of the Yugoslav conflict, since prosecutors in the former Yugoslavia were, as a rule, reluctant to prosecute such crimes;
 "Establishing the facts", highlighting the extensive evidence-gathering and lengthy findings of fact that Tribunal judgments produced;
 "Bringing justice to thousands of victims and giving them a voice", pointing out the large number of witnesses that had been brought before the Tribunal;
 "The accomplishments in international law", describing the fleshing out of several international criminal law concepts which had not been ruled on since the Nuremberg Trials;
 "Strengthening the Rule of Law", referring to the Tribunal's role in promoting the use of international standards in war crimes prosecutions by former Yugoslav republics.

Closure 
The United Nations Security Council passed resolutions 1503 in August 2003 and 1534 in March 2004, which both called for the completion of all cases at both the ICTY and its sister tribunal, the International Criminal Tribunal for Rwanda (ICTR) by 2010.

In December 2010, the Security Council adopted Resolution 1966, which established the International Residual Mechanism for Criminal Tribunals (IRMCT), a body intended to gradually assume residual functions from both the ICTY and the ICTR as they wound down their mandate. Resolution 1966 called upon the Tribunal to finish its work by 31 December 2014 to prepare for its closure and the transfer of its responsibilities.

In a Completion Strategy Report issued in May 2011, the ICTY indicated that it aimed to complete all trials by the end of 2012 and complete all appeals by 2015, with the exception of Radovan Karadžić whose trial was expected to end in 2014 and Ratko Mladić and Goran Hadžić, who were still at large at that time and were not arrested until later that year.

The IRMCT's ICTY branch began functioning on 1 July 2013. Per the Transitional Arrangements adopted by the UN Security Council, the ICTY was to conduct and complete all outstanding first instance trials, including those of Karadžić, Mladić and Hadžić. The ICTY would also conduct and complete all appeal proceedings for which the notice of appeal against the judgement or sentence was filed before 1 July 2013. The IRMCT will handle any appeals for which notice is filed after that date.

The final ICTY trial to be completed in the first instance was that of Ratko Mladić, who was convicted on 22 November 2017. The final case to be considered by the ICTY was an appeal proceeding encompassing six individuals, whose sentences were upheld on 29 November 2017.

Organization 
While operating, the Tribunal employed around 900 staff. Its organisational components were Chambers, Registry and the Office of the Prosecutor (OTP).

Prosecutors 
The Prosecutor was responsible for investigating crimes, gathering evidence and prosecutions and was head of the Office of the Prosecutor (OTP). The Prosecutor was appointed by the UN Security Council upon nomination by the UN Secretary-General.

The last prosecutor was Serge Brammertz. Previous Prosecutors have been Ramón Escovar Salom of Venezuela (1993–1994), however, he never took up that office, Richard Goldstone of South Africa (1994–1996), Louise Arbour of Canada (1996–1999), and Carla Del Ponte of Switzerland (1999–2007). Richard Goldstone, Louise Arbour and Carla Del Ponte also simultaneously served as the Prosecutor of the International Criminal Tribunal for Rwanda until 2003. Graham Blewitt of Australia served as the Deputy Prosecutor from 1994 until 2004. David Tolbert, the President of the International Center for Transitional Justice, was also appointed Deputy Prosecutor of the ICTY in 2004.

Chambers 
Chambers encompassed the judges and their aides. The Tribunal operated three Trial Chambers and one Appeals Chamber. The President of the Tribunal was also the presiding Judge of the Appeals Chamber.

Judges 
At the time of the court's dissolution, there were seven permanent judges and one ad hoc judge who served on the Tribunal. A total of 86 judges have been appointed to the Tribunal from 52 United Nations member states. Of those judges, 51 were permanent judges, 36 were ad litem judges, and one was an ad hoc judge. Note that one judge served as both a permanent and ad litem judge, and another served as both a permanent and ad hoc judge.

UN member and observer states could each submit up to two nominees of different nationalities to the UN Secretary-General. The UN Secretary-General submitted this list to the UN Security Council which selected from 28 to 42 nominees and submitted these nominees to the UN General Assembly. The UN General Assembly then elected 14 judges from that list. Judges served for four years and were eligible for re-election. The UN Secretary-General appointed replacements in case of vacancy for the remainder of the term of office concerned.

On 21 October 2015, Judge Carmel Agius of Malta was elected President of the ICTY and Liu Daqun of China was elected Vice-President; they have assumed their positions on 17 November 2015. His predecessors were Antonio Cassese of Italy (1993–1997), Gabrielle Kirk McDonald of the United States (1997–1999), Claude Jorda of France (1999–2002), Theodor Meron of the United States (2002–2005), Fausto Pocar of Italy (2005–2008), Patrick Robinson of Jamaica (2008–2011), and Theodor Meron (2011–2015).

Registry 
The Registry was responsible for handling the administration of the Tribunal; activities included keeping court records, translating court documents, transporting and accommodating those who appear to testify, operating the Public Information Section, and such general duties as payroll administration, personnel management and procurement. It was also responsible for the Detention Unit for indictees being held during their trial and the Legal Aid program for indictees who cannot pay for their own defence. It was headed by the Registrar, a position occupied over the years by Theo van Boven of the Netherlands (February 1994 to December 1994), Dorothée de Sampayo Garrido-Nijgh of the Netherlands (1995–2000), Hans Holthuis of the Netherlands (2001–2009), and John Hocking of Australia (May 2009 to December 2017).

Detention facilities 

Those defendants on trial and those who were denied a provisional release were detained at the United Nations Detention Unit on the premises of the Penitentiary Institution Haaglanden, location Scheveningen in Belgisch Park, a suburb of The Hague, located some 3 km by road from the courthouse. The indicted were housed in private cells which had a toilet, shower, radio, satellite TV, personal computer (without internet access) and other luxuries. They were allowed to phone family and friends daily and could have conjugal visits. There was also a library, a gym and various rooms used for religious observances. The inmates were allowed to cook for themselves. All of the inmates mixed freely and were not segregated on the basis of nationality. As the cells were more akin to a university residence instead of a jail, some had derisively referred to the ICT as the "Hague Hilton". The reason for this luxury relative to other prisons is that the first president of the court wanted to emphasise that the indictees were innocent until proven guilty.

Indictees 

The Tribunal indicted 161 individuals between 1997 and 2004 and completed proceedings with them as follows:
 111 had trials completed by the ICTY:
 21 were acquitted by the ICTY:
 18 acquittals have stood;
 1 was originally acquitted by the ICTY, but convicted on appeal by the IRMCT of one count (and sentenced to time served) 
 2 were originally acquitted by the ICTY, but following successful appeal by the prosecution the acquittals were overturned and a retrial is being conducted by the IRMCT; and 
 90 were convicted and sentenced by the ICTY:
 87 were transferred to 14 different states where they served their prison sentences, had sentences that amounted to time spent in detention during trial, or died after conviction:
 20 remain imprisoned;
 58 completed their sentences;
 9 died while completing their sentences or after conviction awaiting transfer
 2 were convicted and sentenced, and remain in IRMCT detention awaiting transfer; and
 1 was convicted and sentenced, but has filed an appeal to the IRMCT that is being considered 
 13 had their cases transferred to courts in:
 Bosnia and Herzegovina (10);
 Croatia (2); and
 Serbia (1)
 37 had their cases terminated prior to trial completion, because
 the indictments were withdrawn (20); or
 the indictees died before or after transfer to the Tribunal (17).

The indictees ranged from common soldiers to generals and police commanders all the way to prime ministers. Slobodan Milošević was the first sitting head of state indicted for war crimes. Other "high level" indictees included Milan Babić, former President of the Republika Srpska Krajina; Ramush Haradinaj, former Prime Minister of Kosovo; Radovan Karadžić, former President of the Republika Srpska; Ratko Mladić, former Commander of the Bosnian Serb Army; and Ante Gotovina, former General of the Croatian Army.

The very first hearing at the ICTY was referral request in the Tadić case on 8 November 1994. Croat Serb General and former President of the Republic of Serbian Krajina Goran Hadžić was the last fugitive wanted by the Tribunal to be arrested on 20 July 2011.

An additional 23 individuals have been the subject of contempt proceedings.

Controversies 

Criticisms of the court include:
 Carla Del Ponte, the chief prosecutor of the tribunal, said in 2021 that the US did not want the ICTY to scrutinise war crimes committed by the Kosovo Liberation Army. According to her, Madeleine Albright, the United States secretary of state at the time, told her to slow down the investigation of Ramush Haradinaj.
 Michael Mandel, William Blum and others accused the court of having a pro-NATO bias due to its refusal to prosecute NATO officials and politicians for war crimes.
 On 6 December 2006, the Tribunal at The Hague approved the use of force-feeding of Serbian politician Vojislav Šešelj. They decided it was not "torture, inhuman or degrading treatment if there is a medical necessity to do so... and if the manner in which the detainee is force-fed is not inhuman or degrading".
 Reducing the indictment charges after the arrest of Ratko Mladić, Croatian officials publicly condemned chief prosecutor Serge Brammertz for his announcement that the former Bosnian Serb General, will be tried solely for crimes allegedly committed in Bosnia, not in Croatia.
 Critics have questioned whether the Tribunal exacerbates tensions rather than promotes reconciliation, as is claimed by Tribunal supporters. Polls show a generally negative reaction to the Tribunal among both Serbs and Croats. A majority of Serbs and Croats have expressed doubts regarding the ICTY's integrity and question the tenability of its legal procedures.
 68% of indictees have been Serbs (or Montenegrins), to the extent that a sizeable portion of the Bosnian Serb and Croatian Serb political and military leaderships have been indicted. Many have seen this as reflecting bias, while the Tribunal's defenders have seen this as indicative of the actual proportion of crimes committed. However, Marko Hoare claimed that, aside from Milošević, only Momčilo Perišić (Chief of the General Staff of the Yugoslav Army), who was acquitted, has been indicted from the Serbian military or political top when it comes to wars in Croatia and Bosnia.
 According to Hoare, a former employee at the ICTY, an investigative team worked on indictments of senior members of the "joint criminal enterprise", including not only Milošević but also Veljko Kadijević, Blagoje Adžić, Borisav Jović, Branko Kostić, Momir Bulatović and others. However, Hoare claims that, due to Carla del Ponte's intervention, these drafts were rejected, and the indictment limited to Milošević alone.
 There have been allegations of censorship: in July 2011, the Appeals Chamber of ICTY confirmed the judgment of the Trial Chamber which found journalist and former Tribunal's OTP spokesperson Florence Hartmann guilty of contempt of court and fined her €7,000. She disclosed documents of FR Yugoslavia's Supreme Defense Council meetings and criticized the Tribunal for granting confidentiality of some information in them to protect Serbia's 'vital national interests' during Bosnia's lawsuit against the country for genocide in front of the International Court of Justice. Hartmann argued that Serbia was freed of the charge of genocide because ICTY redacted certain information in the Council meetings. Since these documents have in the meantime been made public by the ICTY itself, a group of organizations and individuals, who supported her, said that the Tribunal in this appellate proceedings "imposed a form of censorship aimed to protect the international judges from any form of criticism". (France refused to extradite Hartmann to serve the prison sentence issued against her by the ICTY after she refused to pay the €7,000 fine.)
 Klaus-Peter Willsch compared the Ante Gotovina verdict, in which the late Croatian president Franjo Tuđman was posthumously found to have been participating in a Joint Criminal Enterprise, with the 897 Cadaver Synod trial in Rome, when Pope Stephen VI had the corpse of Pope Formosus exhumed, put on trial and posthumously convicted.
 Some sentences have been considered too mild, even within the Tribunal, complained at small sentences of convicted war criminals in comparison with their crimes. In 2010, Veselin Šljivančanin's sentence for his involvement in the Vukovar massacre was cut from 17 to 10 years, which caused outrage in Croatia. Upon hearing that news, Vesna Bosanac, who had been in charge of the Vukovar hospital during the fall of the city, said that the "ICTY is dead" for her: "For crimes that he [Šljivančanin], had committed in Vukovar, notably at Ovčara, he should have been jailed for life. I'm outraged.... The Hague(-based) tribunal has showed again that it is not a just tribunal." Danijel Rehak, the head of Croatian Association of Prisoners in Serbian Concentration Camps, said, "The shock of families whose beloved ones were killed at Ovčara is unimaginable. The court made a crucial mistake by accepting a statement of a JNA officer to whom Šljivančanin was a commander. I cannot understand that". Pavle Strugar's 8-year sentence for shelling of Dubrovnik, a UNESCO World Heritage Site, also caused outrage in Croatia. Judge Kevin Parker (of Australia) was named in a Croatian journal (Nacional) as a main cause of the system's failure for having dismissed the testimonies of numerous witnesses.
 Some of the defendants, such as Slobodan Milošević, claimed that the Court has no legal authority because it was established by the UN Security Council instead of the UN General Assembly and so had not been created on a broad international basis. The Tribunal was established on the basis of Chapter VII of the United Nations Charter; the relevant portion of which reads "the Security Council can take measures to maintain or restore international peace and security". The legal criticism has been succinctly stated in a memorandum issued by Austrian Professor Hans Köchler, which was submitted to the President of the Security Council in 1999. British Conservative Party MEP Daniel Hannan has called for the court to be abolished, claiming it is anti-democratic and a violation of national sovereignty.
 The interactive thematic debate on the role of international criminal justice in reconciliation was convened on 10 April 2013 by the President of the General Assembly during the resumed part of the GA's 67th Session. The debate was scheduled after the convictions of Ante Gotovina and Mladen Markač for inciting war crimes against Serbs in Croatia were overturned by an ICTY Appeals Panel in November 2012. The ICTY president Theodor Meron announced that all three Hague war-crimes courts turned down the invitation of UNGA president to participate in the debate about their work. The President of the General Assembly  described Meron's refusal to participate  in this debate as scandalous. He emphasized that he does not shy away from criticizing the ICTY, which has "convicted nobody for inciting crimes committed against Serbs in Croatia." Tomislav Nikolić, the president of Serbia criticized the ICTY, claiming it did not contribute but hindered reconciliation in the former Yugoslavia. He added that although there is no significant ethnic disproportion among the number of casualties in the Yugoslav wars, the ICTY sentenced Serbs and ethnic Serbs to a combined total of 1150 years in prison while claiming that members of other ethnic groups have been sentenced to a total of 55 years for crimes against Serbs. Vitaly Churkin, the ambassador of Russia to the UN, criticized the work of the ICTY, especially the overturned convictions of Gotovina and Ramush Haradinaj.
 Regarding the final case on 29 November 2017 proceeding encompassing six Bosnian-Croat individuals, one of whom, Slobodan Praljak, in protest in court drank a poison and subsequently died, the Prime Minister of Croatia Andrej Plenković claimed the verdict was "unjust" and Praljak's suicide "speaks of deep moral injustice to the six Croats, from Bosnia and Herzegovina and the Croat people". He criticized the verdict because it did not recognize the assistance and support provided by Croatia to Bosnia and Herzegovina and collaboration of both armies at a time when the neighboring state was faced with the "Greater-Serbian aggression" and when its territorial integrity was compromised, as well it alludes to the link between the then leadership of the Republic of Croatia, while in the previous verdict to Bosnian-Serb Ratko Mladić does not recognize the connection with Serbia's state officials at that time.
 Dutch filmmaker Jos de Putter made a trilogy, The Milosevic Case – Glosses at Trial, for Tegenlicht investigative slot at the VPRO. The main hypothesis of the film is that ICTY prosecution has been struggling and failing to prove any link between Milosevic and the media version of the truth of the bloody break-up of Yugoslavia. The legitimacy of the prosecution methodology in securing the witness accounts and evidence, in general, has been examined by the filmmaker.

See also 

 List of people indicted in the International Criminal Tribunal for the former Yugoslavia
 Command responsibility
 International Criminal Court
 Trial of Gotovina et al

Notes

References

Further reading 

 Ackerman, J.E. and O'Sullivan, E.: Practice and procedure of the International Criminal Tribunal for the Former Yugoslavia: with selected materials for the International Criminal Tribunal for Rwanda, The Hague, KLI, 2000.
 Aldrich, G.H.: Jurisdiction of the International Criminal Tribunal for the Former Yugoslavia, American Journal of International Law, 1996, pp. 64–68h
 Bachmann, Klaus; Sparrow-Botero, Thomas and Lambertz, Peter: When justice meets politics. Independence and autonomy of ad hoc international criminal tribunals. Peter Lang International 2013.
 Bassiouni, M.C.: The Law of the International Criminal Tribunal of the Former Yugoslavia, New York, Transnational Publications, 1996.
 Boelaert-Suominen, S.: The International Criminal Tribunal for the Former Yugoslavia (ICTY) anno 1999: its place in the international legal system, mandate and most notable jurisprudence, Polish Yearbook of International Law, 2001, pp. 95–155.
 Boelaert-Suominen, S.: The International Criminal Tribunal for the Former Yugoslavia and the Kosovo Conflict, International Review of the Red Cross, 2000, pp. 217–251.
 
 Cassese, Antonio: The ICTY: A Living and Vital Reality", Journal of International Criminal Justice Vol.2, 2004, No.2, pp. 585–597
 Cisse, C.: The International Tribunals for the Former Yugoslavia and Rwanda: some elements of comparison, Transnational Law and Contemporary Problems, 1997, pp. 103–118.
 Clark, R.S. and SANN, M.: A critical study of the International Criminal Tribunal for the Former Yugoslavia, European Journal of International Law, 1997, pp. 198–200.
 Goldstone, R.J.: Assessing the work of the United Nations war crimes tribunals, Stanford Journal of International Law, 1997, pp. 1–8.
 Ivković, S.K.: Justice by the International Criminal Tribunal for the Former Yugoslavia, Stanford Journal of International Law, 2001, pp. 255–346.
 Jones, J.W.R.D.: The practice of the international criminal tribunals for the Former Yugoslavia and Rwanda, New York, Transnational, 2000.
 Kaszubinski, M.: The International Criminal Tribunal for the Former Yugoslavia, in: Bassiouni, M.C. (ed.), Post-conflict justice, New York, Transnational, 2002, pp. 459–585.
 Kerr, R.: International judicial intervention: the International Criminal Tribunal for the Former Yugoslavia, International Relations, 2000, pp. 17–26.
 Kerr, R.: The International Criminal Tribunal for the Former Yugoslavia: an exercise in law, politics and diplomacy, Oxford, OUP, 2004.
 King, F. and La Rosa, A.: Current Developments. International Criminal Tribunal for the Former Yugoslavia, B.T.I.R., 1997, pp. 533–555.
 Klip, A. and Sluiter, G.: Annotated leading cases of international criminal tribunals; (Vol. III) The International Criminal Tribunal for the Former Yugoslavia 2000–2001, Schoten, Intersentia, 2003.
 Köchler, Hans: Global Justice or Global Revenge? International Criminal Justice at the Crossroads, Vienna/New York, Springer, 2003, pp. 166–184.
 Kolb, R.: The jurisprudence of the Yugoslav and Rwandan Criminal Tribunals on their jurisdiction and on international crimes, British Yearbook of International Law, 2001, pp. 259–315.
 Lamb, S.: The powers of arrest of the International Criminal Tribunal for the Former Yugoslavia, British Yearbook of International Law, 2000, pp. 165–244.
 Laughland, J.: Travesty: The Trial of Slobodan Milošević and the Corruption of International Justice, London, Pluto Press, 2007.
 Lescure, K.: International justice for former Yugoslavia: the working of the International Criminal Tribunal of the Hague, The Hague, KLI, 1996.
 Mak, T.: The Case Against an International War Crimes Tribunal for the former Yugoslavia, (1995) International Peacekeeping, 2:4, 536–563. 
 McAllister, Jacqueline R. 2020. "Deterring Wartime Atrocities: Hard Lessons from the Yugoslav Tribunal." International Security 44(3).  Available at: Deterring Wartime Atrocities: Hard Lessons from the Yugoslav Tribunal.
 McDonald, G.K.: Reflections on the contributions of the International Criminal Tribunal for the Former Yugoslavia, Hastings International and Comparative Law Review, 2001, pp. 155–172.
 Mettraux, G.: Crimes against humanity in the jurisprudence of the International Criminal Tribunal for the Former Yugoslavia and for Rwanda, Harvard International Law Journal, 2002, pp. 237–316.
 Morris, V. and Scharf, M.P.: An insider's guide to the International Criminal Tribunal for the Former Yugoslavia, African Yearbook of International Law, 1995, pp. 441–446.
 Murphy, S.D.: Progress and jurisprudence of the International Criminal Tribunal for the Former Yugoslavia, American Journal of International Law, 1999, pp. 57–96.
 Panovsky, D.: Some war crimes are not better than others: the failure of the International Criminal Tribunal for the Former Yugoslavia to prosecute war crimes in Macedonia, Northwestern University Law Review, 2004, pp. 623–655.
 Pilouras, S.: International Criminal Tribunal for the Former Yugoslavia and Milosevic's trial, New York Law School Journal of Human Rights, 2002, pp. 515–525.
 Pronk, E.: "The ICTY and the people from the former Yugoslavia. A reserved relationship." (thesis)
 Roberts, K.: The law of persecution before the International Criminal Tribunal for the Former Yugoslavia, Leiden Journal of International Law, 2002, pp. 623–663.
 Robinson, P.L.: Ensuring fair and expeditious trials at the International Criminal Tribunal for the Former Yugoslavia, European Journal of International Law, 2000, pp. 569–589.
 Shenk, M.D.: International Criminal Tribunal for the Former Yugoslavia and for Rwanda, The International Lawyer, 1999, pp. 549–554.
 Shraga, D. and Zackalin, R.: The International Criminal Tribunal for the Former Yugoslavia, European Journal of International Law, 1994, pp. 360–380.
 Sjocrona, J.M.: The International Criminal Tribunal for the Former Yugoslavia: some introductory remarks from a defence point of view, Leiden Journal of International Law, 1995, pp. 463–474.
 Tolbert, David: The ICTY: Unforeseen Successes and Foreseeable Shortcomings, The Fletcher Forum of World Affairs, Vol.26, No.2, Summer/Fall 2002, pp. 7–20
 Tolbert, David: Reflections on the ICTY Registry, Journal of International Criminal Justice, Vol.2, No.2, 2004, pp. 480–485
 Vierucci, L.: The First Steps of the International Criminal Tribunal for the Former Yugoslavia, European Journal of International Law, 1995, pp. 134–143.
 Warbrick, C. and McGoldrick, D.: Co-operation with the International Criminal Tribunal for the Former Yugoslavia, International and Comparative Law Quarterly, 1996, pp. 947–953.
 Wilson, Richard Ashby: 'Judging History: the Historical Record of the International Criminal Tribunal for the Former Yugoslavia.' Human Rights Quarterly. 2005. August. Vol. 27, No. 3, pp. 908–942.

External links 

 
 International Center for Transitional Justice, Criminal Justice page
 International Progress Organization: Monitoring of the ICTY
 Del Ponte, Carla (2003). The role of international criminal prosecutions in reconstructing divided communities, public lecture by Carla Del Ponte, Prosecutor, International Criminal Tribunal for the Former Yugoslavia, given at the London School of Economics, 20 October 2003.
 Topical digests of the case law of ICTR and ICTY, Human Rights Watch, 2004
 Hague Justice Portal: Academic gateway to The Hague organisations concerning international peace, justice and security.
 Calendar of court proceedings before the ICTY: Hague Justice Portal
 Why Journalists Should be Worried by the Rwanda Tribunal Precedents (deals also with ICTY) by Thierry Cruvellier for Reporters Without Borders
 SENSE News Agency, a special project based in ICTY
 Complete web-based video archive of the Milosevic trial
 War Crimes, conditionality and EU integration in the Western Balkans, by Vojin Dimitrijevic, Florence Hartmann, Dejan Jovic, Tija Memisevic, edited by Judy Batt, Jelena Obradović, Chaillot Paper No. 116, June 2009, European Union Institute for Security Studies
 Introductory note by Fausto Pocar on the Statute of the International Criminal Tribunal for the former Yugoslavia in the Historic Archives of the United Nations Audiovisual Library of International Law
 Procedural history of the Statute of the International Criminal Tribunal for the former Yugoslavia in the Historic Archives of the United Nations Audiovisual Library of International Law
 Lecture by Fausto Pocar entitled Completing the Mandate: The Legal Challenges Facing the International Criminal Tribunal for the former Yugoslavia in the Lecture Series of the United Nations Audiovisual Library of International Law
 Lecture by Fausto Pocar entitled Contribution of the International Criminal Tribunal for the former Yugoslavia to the Development of International Humanitarian Law in the Lecture Series of the United Nations Audiovisual Library of International Law
 Lecture by Patrick Lipton Robinson, Fairness and Efficiency in the Proceedings of the International Criminal Tribunal for the former Yugoslavia in the Lecture Series of the United Nations Audiovisual Library of International Law

 
Croatian War of Independence
Kosovo War
Yugoslav Wars
War crimes organizations
Organisations based in The Hague
Organizations established in 1993
Organizations disestablished in 2017
Netherlands and the United Nations
United Nations courts and tribunals
Incitement to genocide case law